The Communist Party of Albania (PKSh) is an anti-revisionist Marxist–Leninist communist party in Albania. The party was formed in 1991, as a split from the Party of Labour of Albania which converted itself into the Socialist Party of Albania. It upholds Enver Hoxha and Hoxhaism. The party was led by Hysni Milloshi until his death in 2012.

Nexhmije Hoxha, Enver Hoxha's wife, was a member of the party.

History 
On 16 July 1992, the Albanian parliament voted to ban the party and its newspaper. A law that took effect in June allowed leaders of political parties, members of parliament and government ministers to keep weapons and as the party was banned, its leader Hysni Milloshi was arrested on 22 July 1992 for illegal weapons possession.

The law banning the Communist Party of Albania was repealed in April 1998, and the PKSH became the first communist party after 1991 to legally register at the Electoral Commission.

In 2002, a fraction of PKSH split and merged into that refounded the Albanian Party of Labour. In a 2006 unification congress, the Communist Party of Albania, Albanian Party of Labour and smaller communist parties merged as the Communist Party of Albania. 300 members of these parties participated in this congress and Hysni Milloshi was the leader of the unified party.

In the 2005 parliamentary elections, the party gained 8,901 votes (0.7%) on the proportional list. However, at the 2013 elections its number of votes declined sharply, gathering 899 votes nationwide. In 2017 parliamentary elections it gathered 1,029 votes (0.07%).

PKSH publishes  ('The Voice of Truth'). The youth wing of the party is known as Communist Youth of Albania.

See also 
 Party of Labour of Albania

References

External links 
 

1991 establishments in Albania
Anti-revisionist organizations
Stalinist parties
Hoxhaist parties
Communist parties in Albania
Formerly banned communist parties
International Conference of Marxist–Leninist Parties and Organizations (Unity & Struggle)
Political parties established in 1991
Political parties in Albania
International Meeting of Communist and Workers Parties